The 2015–16 Liga Gimel season was the 48th season of fifth tier football in Israel, with 108 clubs competing in 8 regional divisions for promotion to Liga Bet.

League matches began on 9 October 2015 and ended on 7 May 2016.

Review and events
 At the beginning of the season, Liga Gimel clubs competed in the State Cup, the first four rounds played within each division, with the divisional winners qualifying to the nationwide sixth round. F.C. Hatzor HaGlilit (from Upper Galilee division), Hapoel Bnei Arara 'Ara (from Jezreel division), Hapoel Ironi Or Akiva (from Samaria division) and Hapoel Ihud Bnei Jatt (from Sharon division) all won their divisional finals, played on October 2, 2015. The rest of the divisional finals were played on October 20, 2015, with Shimshon Tel Aviv (Tel Aviv division), Nordia Jerusalem (Central division) and Maccabi Ashdod (South division) winning their matches. F.C. Tzeirei Tamra (Lower Galilee division) also won its divisional cup, as its opponent, Haopel Bnei Nujeidat failed to appear to the final.
 On November 26, 2015, following an IFA Disciplinary Committee decision regarding an abandoned match between Hapoel F.C. Hevel Modi'in and Hapoel Ramla, in which the committee decided that both clubs share responsibility for the match being abandoned, F.C. Hevel Modi'in announced its resignation from the league and forfeited its next match against Hapoel Ironi Gedera.
 On December 04, 2015, during an Upper Galilee division match between Bnei Ma'alot Tashiha and F.C. Hatzor HaGlilit, a Ma'alot-Tarshiha player, Asher Elfasi, attacked the referee and the match was abandoned. Elfasi received a lifetime ban.

Upper Galilee Division

Lower Galilee Division

Jezreel Division

Samaria Division

Sharon Division

Tel Aviv Division

Central Division

South Division

References

External links
Liga Gimel Upper Galilee The Israel Football Association 
Liga Gimel Lower Galilee The Israel Football Association 
Liga Gimel Jezreel The Israel Football Association 
Liga Gimel Samaria The Israel Football Association 
Liga Gimel Sharon The Israel Football Association 
Liga Gimel Tel Aviv The Israel Football Association 
Liga Gimel Central The Israel Football Association 
Liga Gimel South The Israel Football Association 

5
Liga Gimel seasons
Israel Liga Gimel